The 2007 Pacific Games women's football tournament was the second edition of Pacific Games women's football tournament. The competition was held in Samoa from 25 August to 7 September 2011 with the final played at the Toleafoa J.S. Blatter Complex in Apia.

This tournament was the first stage of qualification for the 2008 Olympic Games Women's Football Tournament. Only Papua New Guinea moved on to stage 2.

Vanuatu was listed as an entrant initially, but withdrew before the draw.

Group seedings

Note: Rankings shown are as of March 2007.

Preliminary round

Group A

Group B

Note: while all other groups had the two final matches played simultaneously, this was not the case here.

Knockout stage

Semi-finals

Bronze medal match

Gold medal match

Note: Penateti Feke's goal in the final gave her the tournament's Golden Boot (with 4 goals), and marked the first time in South Pacific Games history that a single player has scored every one of their team's goals en route to the final.

Papua New Guinea advanced to face New Zealand in a playoff game for a spot at the 2008 Olympics.

Goalscorers
8 goals
 Lydia Banabas

4 goals

 Adiela Kurikaba
 Ara Midi
 Penateti Feke

3 goals

 Unaisi Vatulili
 Gloria Hauata

2 goals

 Unaisi Moce
 Cathy Agunam
 Margaret Alau
 Priscilla Konalalai
 Daisy Winas

1 goal

 Jasmine Makiasi
 Teremoana Hewett
 Isabel Urirau
 Regina Mustonen
 Tupou Patia
 Asena Reba Ratu
 Naomi Regu
 Kinisimere Vanua
 Margaret Aka
 Deslyn Siniu
 Natalie Davies
 Semeatu Lemana
 Crystal Annie
 Margaret Daudau
 Diane Jusuts
 Layda Samani 
 Maima Marmouyet
 Mimosa Marmouyet

Own goal
 Henifa Bryce (playing against Tahiti)

See also
Pacific Games
Football at the 2007 South Pacific Games – Men's tournament

References

Football at the 2007 South Pacific Games
Pac
2007 South Pacific Games
Pac
Football at the Pacific Games
2007 South Pacific Games